{|

{{Infobox ship characteristics
| Hide header=
| Header caption=
| Ship class=
| Ship type=Ship of the line
| Ship tonnage= 
| Ship displacement= 
| Ship tons burthen= 1,016 tons
| Ship length= 
| Ship beam=  
| Ship height=
| Ship draught=  
| Ship decks=
| Ship deck clearance=
| Ship sail plan=Full-rigged ship
| Ship speed 
| Ship range= 
| Ship boats=
| Ship complement=559 
| Ship armament=* 26 × 24-pounder guns
 26 × 12-pounder guns
 12 × 8-pounder guns<ref name="oldenburg">{{cite web |url=http://www.milhist.dk/vaaben/vands/oldenburg_wreck/oldenburg_wreck.htm |title=The Wreck of the Oldenborg |first=Gert |last=Laursen |work=milhist.dk |year=2008 |access-date=24 June 2012 |url-status=dead |archive-url=https://web.archive.org/web/20110429031153/http://milhist.dk/vaaben/vands/oldenburg_wreck/oldenburg_wreck.htm |archive-date=29 April 2011 }}</ref>

| Ship armour=
| Ship notes=
}}
|}Indfødsretten''' (Danish, lit. Citizenship) was a 64-gun ship of the line in the Royal Dano-Norwegian Navy commissioned in 1787. She was one of a class of five ships designed and constructed by naval architect Henrik Gerner.

Construction and designIndfødsretten was constructed at Nyholm to a design by naval architect Henrik Gerner. She was laid down on 27 June 1784, launched on 27 April 1786 and the construction was completed on 12 October 1787.

Career
During the Battle of Copenhagen on 2 April 1801, this blockship was commanded by Captain A. de Thurah with a complement of 394 sailors. The ship suffered heavy casualties in the battle; 21 were killed and 41 wounded. The ship struck her colours at 15.00.Admiral Lord Nelson and his Navy After her capture, Indfødsretten'' was burnt, along with all the other captured Danish warships except Holsteen.

Notes

References

Bibliography
 Url

See also
List of ships captured in the 19th century

1786 ships
Ships of the line of the Royal Dano-Norwegian Navy
Captured ships
Napoleonic-era ships
Maritime incidents in 1801
Ships built in Copenhagen
Ships designed by Henrik Gerner